Abrothrix jelskii, also known as Jelski's Altiplano mouse, Jelski's grass mouse, or the ornate akodont, is a species of rodent in the genus Abrothrix of family Cricetidae. It is found in the altiplano habitat of the Andes from central Peru through Bolivia into northwestern Argentina. Populations classified under A. jelskii include more than one species.

References

Literature cited
Bernal, N., Zeballos, H., Vargas, J., Patterson, B., Jayat, J.P., and Pardinas, U. 2008. . In IUCN. IUCN Red List of Threatened Species. Version 2009.2. <www.iucnredlist.org>. Downloaded on January 12, 2010.
Duff, A. and Lawson, A. 2004. Mammals of the World: A checklist. New Haven, Connecticut: Yale University Press, 312 pp. 
Musser, G.G. and Carleton, M.D. 2005. Superfamily Muroidea. Pp. 894–1531 in Wilson, D.E. and Reeder, D.M. (eds.). Mammal Species of the World: a taxonomic and geographic reference. 3rd ed. Baltimore: The Johns Hopkins University Press, 2 vols., 2142 pp. 

Abrothrix
Mammals of the Andes
Mammals of Argentina
Mammals of Bolivia
Mammals of Peru
Mammals described in 1894
Taxa named by Oldfield Thomas
Taxonomy articles created by Polbot